Yrjö Erik Mikael Saarela (13 July 1884 – 30 June 1951) was a Finnish wrestler, who won an Olympic gold and a world championship.

Wrestling 
Saarela began wrestling in 1906, coached by Carl Allén.

By 1908 he was a well-established wrestler and was nominated into the Finnish Olympic team without trials.

He won silver at the 1908 Olympics, which was a single-elimination tournament:

According to rumours, Weckman bribed Saarela to throw the final. Modern sportswriters Arto Teronen and Jouko Vuolle consider that there is plenty of circumstantial evidence in favour.

He won the Finnish national heavyweight championship in 1908 and 1909.

He won the over 83 kg class at the 1911 World Wrestling Championships.

He won the Olympic gold at the 1912 Games, which was a double-elimination tournament:

The fifth round loss was a favour to Olin, who would've been eliminated otherwise. Saarela withdrew faking a knee injury. Olin returned the favour by letting him win the gold medal match, even though Saarela was exhausted after a three-hour bout against Jensen.

He began a brief professional career after the 1912 games, wrestling mostly in international circuses touring in Finland.

His amateur status was reinstated in 1924. He returned to form at the age of 44, when he won Finnish national heavyweight championship bronze in 1929. He was a regional coaching consultant in the Finnish Wrestling Federation in the 1930s.

He received the Cross of Merit, in gold, of the Finnish Sports from the Ministry of Education in 1948.

His Olympic medals are in the collection of the Sports Museum of Finland.

Biography 
His parents were Jaakko Sarkkinen and Maria Sunila, and he was born Yrjö Sarkkinen. They switched the last name after buying and moving to a farm named Saarela. He eventually inherited two thirds of the farm.

He married Ester Elisabeth Markuksela in 1910. They had children:
 Aino Kyllikki (1910–1972)
 Ahti Johannes (1912–1913)
 Erkko Olavi (1913–1972)
 Marja-Liisa (1915–1953)
 Yrjö Eino Mikael (1920–1940)
 Pentti Johannes (1922–1942)
 Pirkko Kaarina (1927–). She married economist Kaarlo Larna.

His personal economy suffered when had acted as a surety to loans that defaulted during the Great Depression. His farm bankrupted in 1931. However, thanks to an inheritance, he recovered quickly and returned to farming.

He suffered a stroke in 1944 and was paralyzed.

After he died, he was buried in his family plot. His name on the gravestone has an engraving of the Olympic rings. Saarela is the only Olympic winner from North Ostrobothnia.

Sources

Literature

References

1884 births
1951 deaths
People from Liminka
Wrestlers at the 1908 Summer Olympics
Wrestlers at the 1912 Summer Olympics
Finnish male sport wrestlers
Olympic wrestlers of Finland
Olympic gold medalists for Finland
Olympic silver medalists for Finland
Olympic medalists in wrestling
Medalists at the 1908 Summer Olympics
Medalists at the 1912 Summer Olympics
World Wrestling Championships medalists
Finnish wrestling coaches
Sportspeople from North Ostrobothnia